The Ministry of Industry and Trade (MOIT) is the government ministry in Vietnam responsible for the advancement, promotion, governance, regulation, management and growth of industry and trade. The former Ministry of Trade has its origins in 1945 with the formation of the modern National Unification Cabinet, and became a ministry in its own right in 1955. The Ministry of Trade merged with the Ministry of Industry in 2007 to form the Ministry of Industry and trade.
The current Minister of Industry and Trade is Nguyễn Hồng Diên. Ministry main offices are located in Hanoi.

Research institutions
Industry research organisations under the purview of the Ministry include the following; organisation is located in Hanoi except where noted:
 Institute for Industry Policy and Strategy (IPS), Director General: Dr. Phan Dang Tuat
 Institute for Leather and Footwear Research, Director: Ms. Do Thi Hoi
 Ceramic and Industrial Glass Institute (CIGI), Director: Mr. Hoang Ba Thinh
 Research Institute of Mines and Metallurgy (RIMM), Director: Mr. Hoang Van Khanh
 Electronics - Informatics and Automation Research Institute (VIELINA), Director: Dr. Nguyen Duy Hung Link
 Food Industry Research Institute (FIRI), Director: Dr. Le Duc Manh
 National Research Institute for Mechanical Engineering (NARIME), Director: Mr. Nguyen Chi Sang
 Vegetable Oil - Flavouring and Cosmetics Research Institute  (VOFCI), in Ho Chi Minh City; Director: Mr. Nguyen Trung Phong
 Institute of Machinery and Industrial Equipment (IMI HOLDINGS), Director General: Dr. Truong Huu Chi Link

Vocational schools
Vocational schools under the purview of the Ministry include:

Universities and colleges
 University of Industry (HUI), Gò Vấp District, Ho Chi Minh City Link
 Ha Noi Industrial University (HIC), Từ Liêm District, Hanoi Link
 Industrial Economics and Technique College I, Hai Bà Trưng District, Hanoi
 Industrial Economics and Technique College II, Phước Long B, District 9, Ho Chi Minh City
 Cao Thang Technical College, District 1, Ho Chi Minh City
 Chemical Industry College, Phong Chau District, Phú Thọ Province
 Ho Chi Minh College of Foodstuff Industry, Tân Phú District, HCMC
 Mining Technical College, Đông Triều District, Quảng Ninh Province
 Mechanics and Metallurgy College, Lương Sơn Commune, Thái Nguyên City
 Sao Do (Red Star) Industrial College, Chí Linh District, Hải Dương Province
 Viet - Hung Industrial College, Sơn Tây
 Nam Định Industrial College, Nam Định City Link
 Tuy Hòa Industrial College, Tuy Hòa Town in Phú Yên Province
 Hanoi Industrial Economic College, (1) Thanh Trì District, Hanoi and (2) Cầu Giấy District, Hanoi
 Huế Industrial College, Huế

Vocational high schools
 Cam Pha Industrial High School, Cẩm Phả Town, Quảng Ninh Province
 Industrial High School III, Phúc Yên Town, Vĩnh Phúc Link
 Thái Nguyên Industrial High School, Thái Nguyên Town
 Viet - Duc Industrial High School, Sông Công Town, Thái Nguyên Province
 Industrial Technique High School, Bắc Giang Town/Province
 Industry and Construction High School, Uông Bí Town, Quảng Ninh Province
 Foodstuff Technology High School, Việt Trì City, Phú Thọ Province
 Electrical Engineering High School, Phổ Yên District, Thái Nguyên Province
 Industrial Economic Management School, Giai Pham, Hưng Yên

See also
 Government of Vietnam
 Economy of Vietnam

References

External links
 (VN) and (EN) Ministry of Industry and Trade official site

Industry and Trade
Industry in Vietnam
Vietnam
Governmental office in Hanoi
Vietnam, Industry and Trade
1955 establishments in North Vietnam